This is a list of diplomatic missions of Malta, excluding honorary consulates. Malta has a modest diplomatic presence. The Maltese Ministry of Foreign Affairs oversees the direction of the nation's foreign policy.

Africa

 Algiers (Consulate)

 Cairo (Embassy)

 Addis Ababa (Embassy)

 Accra (High Commission)

 Tripoli (Embassy)

 Casablanca (Consulate-General)

 Tunis (Embassy)

Americas

 Brasília (Embassy)

 Toronto (Consulate-General)

 Washington, D.C. (Embassy)

Asia

 Beijing (Embassy)
 Shanghai (Consulate-General)

 New Delhi (High Commission)

 Tel Aviv (Embassy)

 Tokyo (Embassy)

 Kuwait City (Embassy)

 Ramallah (Representative Office)

 Doha (Embassy)

 Riyadh (Embassy)

 Ankara (Embassy)
 Istanbul (Consulate-General)

 Abu Dhabi (Embassy)
 Dubai (Consulate-General)

Europe

 Vienna (Embassy)

 Brussels (Embassy)

 Copenhagen (Embassy)

 Paris (Embassy)

 Berlin (Embassy)

 Athens (Embassy)

 Dublin (Embassy)

 Rome (Embassy)

 The Hague (Embassy)

 Warsaw (Embassy)

 Lisbon (Embassy)

 Moscow (Embassy)

 Madrid (Embassy)

 London (High Commission)

Oceania

 Canberra (High Commission)
 Melbourne (Consulate-General)
 Sydney (Consulate-General)

Multilateral organizations
 Brussels (Permanent Missions to the European Union)
 Geneva (Permanent Mission to the United Nations and international organizations)
 New York City (Permanent Mission to the United Nations)
 Paris (Permanent Mission to UNESCO)
 Rome (Permanent Mission to Food and Agriculture Organization)
 Strasbourg (Permanent Mission to the Council of Europe)
 Vienna (Permanent Mission to the Organization for Security and Co-operation in Europe)

Gallery

See also
Foreign relations of Malta
Ministry of Foreign Affairs (Malta)

Notes

References

Ministry of Foreign Affairs of Malta

 
Diplomatic missions
Malta